Gayshor is a rural locality (a village) in Leninskoye Rural Settlement, Kudymkarsky District, Perm Krai, Russia. The population was 37 as of 2010.

Geography 
Gayshor is located 27 km southwest of Kudymkar (the district's administrative centre) by road. Kanamova is the nearest rural locality.

References 

Rural localities in Kudymkarsky District